Karri Kathleen Turner (born December 21, 1966) is an American television actress who is best known for playing Lieutenant Harriet Sims in the television series JAG (1997–2005).

Biography

Turner was born in Fort Worth, Texas and raised in Bentonville, Arkansas. She originally considered a Drama/Tele/Film degree at Oklahoma's Oral Roberts University before committing entirely to acting and moving to southern California to attend the American Academy of Dramatic Arts. At one time, she was a member of The Groundlings, a California improvisational comedy troupe.

Her recent film credits include Get Smart and An American Carol. She has had extensive stage experience in such plays as Godspell and Charley's Aunt, and appeared in 2003 as Susan in the award-winning comic short The Date. She has also had recurring roles in Caroline in the City, The X-Files and South Park.

She accompanied comedians Kathy Griffin and Michael McDonald to Iraq to perform for troops serving for the United States stationed there, a performance broadcast as part of Griffin's series My Life on the D-List and has completed 13 USO tours as of 2012, as well as work for other groups such as the young challenge program Nation Guard, American Freedom Foundation and five tours with Stars for Stripes.

In January 2020 it was revealed that Turner would return to her acting career with an appearance in the NCIS episode "In the Wind", as "Micki Kaydar".

Partial filmography

Film

Television

Live-action

Animated

Video game

References

External links

1966 births
American television actresses
Living people
People from Bentonville, Arkansas
People from Fort Worth, Texas
Actresses from Texas
Oral Roberts University alumni
21st-century American women